Capitol Dome is a  summit located in Capitol Reef National Park, in Wayne County, Utah, United States. Precipitation runoff from this feature is drained by tributaries of the Fremont River, which in turn is within the Colorado River drainage basin. This geological feature's dome-like shape reminded early explorers and settlers of capitol buildings, and lent the park its name.

Geology
Capitol Dome is composed of Navajo Sandstone, which is believed to have formed about 180 million years ago as a giant
sand sea, the largest in Earth's history. In a hot, dry climate, wind blew over sand dunes, creating large, sweeping crossbeds which date to the Jurassic. Long after the sedimentary rocks were deposited, the Colorado Plateau was uplifted relatively evenly, keeping the layers roughly horizontal, but Capitol Reef is an exception because of the Waterpocket Fold, a classic monocline, which formed between 50 and 70 million years ago during the Laramide Orogeny.

Gallery

Climate
Spring and fall are the most favorable seasons to visit Capitol Dome. According to the Köppen climate classification system, it is located in a Cold semi-arid climate zone, which is defined by the coldest month having an average mean temperature below 32 °F (0 °C), and at least 50% of the total annual precipitation being received during the spring and summer.

See also

 List of mountains in Utah
 Geology of the Capitol Reef area

References

External links

 Capitol Reef National Park National Park Service
 Weather Forecast: National Weather Service

Mountains of Utah
Capitol Reef National Park
Mountains of Wayne County, Utah
Sandstone formations of the United States
Colorado Plateau